Lennox and Addington County is a county and census division of the Canadian province of Ontario. The county seat is Greater Napanee. It is located in the subregion of Southern Ontario named Eastern Ontario.

Around the middle of the 19th century, the Addington Road was built by the province to encourage settlement in the northern sections of the county.

Historical evolution
The two original counties of Lennox and Addington, respectively named after Charles Lennox, 3rd Duke of Richmond and Henry Addington, 1st Viscount Sidmouth, were organized for electoral purposes in 1792, and were situated within the Mecklenburg District. Mecklenburg was renamed as the "Midland District" in 1792.

In 1798, the Parliament of Upper Canada passed legislation to provide, that, at the beginning of 1800:

In 1821, the newly surveyed township of Kaladar was added to the counties.

In 1845, the counties regained their separate identities, but still remained united for electoral purposes. The newly surveyed township of Anglesea was added to Addington at that time.

At the beginning of 1850, Midland District was abolished, and the United Counties of Frontenac, Lennox and Addington replaced it for municipal and judicial purposes. In 1860, Lennox and Addington were formally amalgamated as the "County of Lennox and Addington", and declared to be the junior county in the United Counties. The townships of Effingham, Abinger, Ashby and Denbigh were added to the County at the same time.

Upon the dissolution of the United Counties at the beginning of 1865, the County became separate for all purposes.

In the late 1990s, the County's municipalities were reorganized to form the town of Greater Napanee and the townships of Addington Highlands, Loyalist, and  Stone Mills.

Demographics

Notable inhabitants
 Charles Jones, composer
 Terence Dickinson, awards-winning astronomy author and expert in astrophotography
 Avril Lavigne, musician
 Daniel Woolf, historian and former principal of Queen’s University

See also
 List of municipalities in Ontario
 List of Ontario Census Divisions
 List of townships in Ontario
 List of secondary schools in Ontario#Lennox and Addington County

References

External links

 
Counties in Ontario
1860 establishments in Canada